Kerwada is a small village in Gujarat, India. The village's population is mainly Muslim and Hindu and Jain. The second speaker of Gujarat State was from the village named Shree Mansinhji Bhasaheb Rana. In ancient days the monarch established by Rajput Rana warriors of Vanthali of Junagarh. Later on they are converted to Muslim. Till date there remarkable presence of there in the village.

Dajipir Dargah Urs (fun fair) celebrate every year on 'Vaisakh Sud Poonam'. 

Villages in Bharuch district